Mrityunjay may refer to
 Mahamrityunjaya Mantra
 Mrityunjay: The Jnanpith Award-winning 1979 Assamese novel by Birendra Kumar Bhattacharya
 The Marathi novel by Shivaji Sawant
 Mrityunjay (TV series), a 1996 television series directed by Dr. Chandraprakash Dwivedi.